Wyatt Henderson (born November 10, 1956) is a former American football defensive back. He played for the San Diego Chargers in 1981, the Oakland Invaders in 1983 and for the Jacksonville Bulls in 1984.

References

1956 births
Living people
American football defensive backs
Fresno State Bulldogs football players
San Diego Chargers players
Oakland Invaders players
Jacksonville Bulls players